Alexei Vasilievich Haieff (August 25, 1914 – March 1, 1994) was an American composer of orchestral and choral works.  He is known for following Stravinsky's neoclassicism, observing an austere economy of means, and achieving modernistic effects by a display of rhythmic agitation, often with jazzy undertones.

Background
Born in Blagoveshchensk, in the Russian Far East, Haieff received his primary education at Harbin, Manchuria. In 1931 he went to the U.S., where he studied with Rubin Goldmark and Frederick Jacobi at the Juilliard School of Music in New York City (1934–38). In 1938-39 he also studied with Nadia Boulanger in Paris and in Cambridge, Massachusetts. He became a U.S. citizen and held U.S. citizenship for 55 years, until his death.

He held a Guggenheim Fellowship in 1946 and again in 1949, and was a Fellow at the American Academy in Rome (1947–48). His Divertimento (1944) was choreographed by George Balanchine in 1947. He won the Rome Prize in 1949. He was a visiting composition and music theory professor at Carnegie Institute of Technology  for the 1962-63 School year.

He was a professor at the University at Buffalo (1962–68), and composer-in-residence at the University of Utah (1968–70). His Piano Concerto won the New York Music Critics' Circle Award (1952) and his 2nd Symphony the American International Music Fund Award (1957).

Haieff's notable students include Paul Ramsier.

He was married to Sheila Jeanne Agatha van Meurs in 1988. He died in Rome, Italy, at the age of 79.

List of works

Ballets
 The Princess Zondilda and Her Entourage (1946)
 Beauty and the Beast (1947)

Orchestral
 Symphony No. 1 (1942)
 Symphony No. 2 (Boston, April 11, 1958)
 Symphony No. 3 (New Haven, Conn., April 11, 1961)
 Divertimento (N.Y., April 5, 1946)
 Violin Concerto (1948)
 Piano Concerto (N.Y., April 27, 1952)
 Ballet in E (1955)
 Éloge for Chamber Orch. (1967)

Chamber music
 Sonatina for String Quartet (1937)
 3 Bagatelles for Oboe and Bassoon (1939)
 Serenade for Oboe, Clarinet, Bassoon, and Piano (1942)
 Eclogue for Cello and Piano (1947)
 String Quartet (1951)
 La Nouvelle Héloïse for Harp and String Quartet (1963)
 Cello Sonata (1963)
 Rhapsodies for Guitar and Harpsichord (1980)
 Wind Quintet (1983)

Piano Compositions
 Sonata for 2 Pianos (1945)
 Gifts and Semblances (1940–48)
 Five Pieces for Piano (1946–48)
 Four Juke Box Pieces (1952)
 Notes of Thanks (1954–61)
 Piano Sonata (1955)

Vocal/Choral 
 Caligula for Baritone and Orch., after Robert Lowell (N.Y., Nov. 5, 1971)

Recordings
Recordings in current CD release ( with selected movements available on YouTube):

 Piano Concerto (N.Y., April 27, 1952) CD Tiger of Harbin
 Divertimento (N.Y., April 5, 1946) CD Kyriena
 Ballet in E (1955) CD Kyriena
 Sonata for Violoncello and Piano (1963) CD Kyriena
 String Quartet (1951) CD Kyriena
 Sonata for 2 Pianos (1945) CD Kirill and Anna Gliadkovsky Play Alexei Haieff (also on CD Tiger of Harbin)
 Gifts and Semblances (1940–48) CD Kirill and Anna Gliadkovsky Play Alexei Haieff (also on CD Manhattan Piano)
 Five Pieces for Piano (1946–48) CD Manhattan Piano
 Four Juke Box Pieces (1952) CD Manhattan Piano (also on CD K and A Gliadkovsky Play A H)
 Notes of Thanks (1954–61) CD Manhattan Piano
 Piano Sonata (1955) CD Manhattan Piano (also on CD Tiger of Harbin)

References

External links
The Alexei Haieff papers(the composer's personal papers and scores) in the Music Division of The New York Public Library for the Performing Arts.
(https://www.washingtonpost.com/wp-dyn/content/article/2010/03/04/AR2010030404787.html  Review of Haieff Divertimento ballet performance in Mar 2010 Kennedy Center, Washington D.C.
New York Times obituary
Interview with Alexei Haieff, August 17, 1989
(https://web.archive.org/web/20200225202926/http://www.alexei.com/  New CD releases of Alexei Haieff music by Alexei Records, January 21, 2010

1914 births
1994 deaths
20th-century American composers
20th-century American male musicians
American male composers
Ballet composers
Juilliard School alumni
University at Buffalo faculty
People from Blagoveshchensk
Soviet emigrants to the United States